André Lichtenberger (29 November 1870, Strasbourg – 23 March 1940, Paris) was a French novelist and sociologist. He held a Doctor of Letters in history.  He was the son of theologian Frédéric Auguste Lichtenberger.

Published works
Le Socialisme au XVIIIème siècle (1895), thesis
Contes Héroïques (1897), stories from the French Revolution
Mon Petit Trott and La Petite Soeur de Trott (1898), stories depicting the mindset of a child.
Le Socialisme Utopique (1898)
Le Socialisme et la Révolution française (1898)
La Mort de Corinthe (1900), Roman archaeology
Portraits de Jeunes Filles (1900)
Père (1901)
Rédemption (1902)
Portraits d'Aïeules (1903)
M. de Migurac ou Le Marquis Philosophe (1903)
Les Centaures (1904), a poem written in prose.
Line (1905)
Gorri le Forban (1906)
L'Automne (1907)
Notre Minnie (1907)
La Folle Aventure (1908)
La Petite (1909)
Le Petit Roi (1910)
Tous Héros (1910)
Juste Lobel, Alsacien (1911)
Petite Madame (1912)
Kaligouça le Coeur Fidèle (1913)
Le Sang Nouveau (1914)
Bèche (1920)
Raramémé (1921)
Scènes en Famille (1921)
Le Petit Chaperon Vert  (1922)

English Translations published in the United States

 The Centaurs [Les Centaures, 1904] translated by Brian Stableford, 2013, Black Coat Press, 
 Children of the Crab [Raramémé, 1921] translated by Brian Stableford, 2013, Black Coat Press,

External links
 

1870 births
1940 deaths
Writers from Strasbourg
French sociologists
19th-century French novelists
20th-century French novelists
Lycée Louis-le-Grand alumni
French male novelists
19th-century French male writers
20th-century French male writers